South Summit Lake is a lake in Thunder Bay, Unorganized, Thunder Bay District, Ontario, Canada, about  north of Lake Nipigon and  northeast of the community of Armstrong.

Hydrology
The primary inflow is over the Summit Control Dam from Mojikit Lake, water backed up into the lake from the Ogoki Reservoir on the Ogoki River, part of the Albany River system in the James Bay drainage basin. The diverted water flows into the north end of South Summit Lake, and out at the south end over the Stork Falls to Stork Lake. The water continues south through a series of lakes and the Little Jackfish River to Lake Nipigon, then via the Nipigon River into Lake Superior.

Notes

References

Lakes of Thunder Bay District